Cum Laude! is the third studio album by The Velvet Teen. It was first released in Japan on June 28, 2006 (featuring three bonus tracks), and in the US on July 25, 2006. It was preceded by the GyzmKid EP on May 9, 2006. This is the first album recorded with drummer Casey Deitz after the departure of original drummer Logan Whitehurst, and features a more IDM-influenced noise rock sound as opposed to the baroque pop of previous album, Elysium.

Track listing 

 "333" – 3:35
 "Flicking Clint" – 2:28
 "Rhodekill" – 4:31
 "False Profits" – 3:11
 "Tokyoto" – 2:33
 "Noi Boi" – 3:48
 "Spin the Wink" – 4:35
 "Bloom" – 2:42
 "Building a Whale" – 3:29
 "In a Steadman Spray" – 4:19
 "Around the Roller Rink" – 3:41
 "GyzmKid" – 4:13

Japan bonus tracks
  "No One Gets the Best of Me" – 6:01
 "Spin the Wink" (Little Cat Remix) – 4:36
 "False Profits" (Cute Version) – 2:55

Credits 
 Judah Nagler - vocals, guitar, keyboards, synthesizer, programming
 Josh Staples - bass, vocals
 Casey Deitz - drums, vocals
 Additional vocals on "False Profits" and "Noi Boi" by Ashley Allred.
 Illustrations by Judah Nagler, design and layout by Josh Staples and Judah Nagler.
 Recorded at Fashion Castle, Happy Acres, Ephriam's house, and Judah's house.

References 

The Velvet Teen albums
2006 albums